SMS ZPRP Gdańsk was a men's handball team based in Gdańsk, Poland. SMS Gdańsk were one of three "Sports Championship Schools" in Poland run by the Poland Handball Federation.

Handball and Education
The school itself focused on the education of its students, but also has a strong focus on the development of the students in handball. Due to the association of the club with the Poland Handball Federation the club could not be promoted to the Superliga, but also could not be relegated to the 2. Liga either, providing consistent competitiveness for the students. From the teams formation in 1997 until the school was closed in 2021, nearly 100 players went from playing and developing with SMS Gdańsk to playing in the Superliga, Poland's highest handball league.

Due to issues relating to having a sports hall for the club to train in, it was announced in 2019 that the NLO SMS ZPRP Gdańsk sports school was to be moved to Kwidzyn. After protests from the students it was announced that current students at the time would continue their studies in Gdańsk, while the new students would start their studies at NLO SMS ZPRP Kwidzyn. The club were dissolved at the end of the 2020–21 season after 24 years in operation.

Seasons

SMS Gdańsk seasons from 2010 to 2021.

Notes
In the Polish Handball Leagues the points for wins has changed over time, with 2 pts for a win up until the 2016–17 season and 3 pts for a win from the 2017–18 season.
Since the 2017–18 season penalty shootouts have been used to determine draws, where the winner of the shootouts will get 2 pts while the loser gains the normal 1 pt.
The 2019–20 season was disrupted by the Covid-19 pandemic, with SMS playing only 13 of the expected 20 games, fewer than the other clubs in their group.

References

Polish handball clubs
Sport in Gdańsk